Bonten Media Group was a New York City-based owner of television broadcast stations in the United States. It was formed by Randall D. Bongarten and Diamond Castle Holdings in November 2006. Its first acquisition was 14 stations from Bluestone Television, founded by Sandy DiPasquale and Providence Equity Partners (who would later form Newport Television) on May 31, 2007. Bluestone had acquired the same stations from Lamco Communications in 2004. On January 1, 2008, Bonten entered into an agreement with Esteem Broadcasting to provide services to the Fox affiliates (WFXI/WYDO) in the Greenville-New Bern market, in addition to WEMT in the Tri-Cities area of Northeastern Tennessee and Southwestern Virginia, bringing the number of stations which Bonten Media Group owns or provides services up to 16 from 13.

On April 21, 2017, Sinclair Broadcast Group announced its intent to purchase the Bonten stations for $240 million. The deal came immediately following the re-instatement of the "UHF discount", which reduces the calculated "reach" of a station for the purposes of national ownership limits if it broadcasts on a UHF channel. The sale was approved on June 30, and the sale was completed on September 1.

Former Bonten Media-owned stations
Stations are arranged in alphabetical order by state and city of license.

Note:
1 Owned by Esteem Broadcasting, LLC, Bonten operated these stations through an shared services agreement.

See also
 Sainte Partners II, L.P.

References

Defunct television broadcasting companies of the United States
Companies based in New York City
Sinclair Broadcast Group
Mass media companies established in 2006
Mass media companies disestablished in 2017
2017 mergers and acquisitions